Hashoo Group is a Pakistani conglomerate company which is active in hospitality, oil and gas sectors. It was founded in 1960 by Saddaruddin Hashwani in Karachi.

History
Hashoo Group was established in 1960 as Hassan Ali & Company, a commodities trading company based in Karachi Port. By the 1970s, it had become one of Pakistan's largest trading companies. However, in 1972, the Government of Pakistan nationalized cotton and rice exports leading the Hashoo Group to diversify into the hospitality sector. In 1978, the group established Holiday Inn Hotel in Karachi, and then another one in Islamabad in 1981. Both of the hotels were converted into Marriott brand in the 1990s. In 1985, the group made a successful bid for the majority shares of Pakistan Services Limited, which then owned four Inter-Continental Hotels across Pakistan, the hotels were re-branded into Pearl-Continental Hotels.

In 1995, Hashoo Group acquired the US-based corporation Occidental Petroleum's Pakistan operations (now known as Orient Petroleum Inc.). In 2001, it acquired the Destinations of the World franchise in Pakistan. In 2012, the group launched Hotel One, a mid-range hotel chain in Pakistan.

In October 2013, Tullow Pakistan exited the Pakistani market and sold its assets to Ocean Pakistan Limited, a subsidiary of the Hashoo Group.

In March 2016, BHP Billiton sold its Pakistani oil and gas operations to Hashoo Group. In 2016, Murtaza Hashwani, Chairman of Hashoo Foundation, and Deputy Chairman of Hashoo Group took the string of the company on his own hand and lead the legacy of his father further. 

In 2019, Hashoo Group won 3 CSR awards “Best CSR Practices”, “Women Welfare Empowerment & Development”, and “Education & Scholarships” at 11th Corporate Social Responsibility Awards 2019 for the social development works received by Murtaza Hashwani, Deputy Chairman of Hashoo Group.

Companies

Tours and travels 

 Pearl Tour & Travels (Pvt) Limited (car rental division)
 Pearl Tours & Travels (Pvt) Limited(Tours division)
 Trans Air Travels (Pvt) Limited
 Destinations of the World - Pakistan
 Marriott Hotels, Pakistan
 Pearl-Continental Hotels & Resorts with locations in all major cities of Pakistan
 Hotel One by PC

Information technology 

 Net-21 (Pvt) Limited

Oil and gas 

 Ocean Pakistan Limited.
 Zaaver Petroleum Corporation Limited
 OPI Gas (Pvt) Limited

Minerals 

 Zaver Chemicals (Pvt) Limited
 Zaver Mining Company Limited
 Zaver Oils Limited

Pharmaceuticals

 Gelcaps (Pakistan) Ltd.

Ceramics 

 Pearl Ceramics (Previously known as Cera-e-Noor)

Investments 

 ''Pakistan Services Limited (PSL) operating Pearl Continental Hotel chain of 6 hotels in Pakistan - listed on the Karachi Stock Exchange
 Hashwani Sales & Services (Pvt) Limited
 Hashoo

Trading companies 
 Hashoo International (Pvt) Limited
 Hasan Ali & Company (Pvt) Limited
 Genesis Trading (Pvt) Limited
 Muzaffar and Companies

Welfare 
 Hashoo Foundation
 Umeed-e-Noor
 Scholarship

See also 
List of largest companies in Pakistan

References

External links 
 Hashoo Group - Official site
 Timeline of Hashoo Group
 Pearl Tours & Travel – Hospitality Beyond Borders
 Documentary on Hashoo Group of Companies on YouTube

Conglomerate companies established in 1960
Conglomerate companies of Pakistan
Companies based in Islamabad
Pakistani companies established in 1960